William Jacob "Jake" Luhrs is an American musician best known as the lead vocalist of American metalcore band August Burns Red.

Background 
Luhrs first entered the music scene in Columbia, South Carolina where he was the frontman for a band known as She Walks In Beauty. The band released two EPs on which Luhrs was featured but eventually disbanded. After vocalist Josh McManness left, Luhrs got in touch with August Burns Red through Myspace which started his career with the band. Luhrs has performed on all the ABR albums except 2005's Thrill Seeker and 2003's Looks Fragile After All. Luhrs has performed both studio and live guest vocal spots for bands such as Pierce the Veil, Blessthefall, and For Today. Luhrs runs a charity called Heart Support. Luhrs, along with Matt Greiner and JB Brubaker and members of We Came as Romans and Blessthefall, appear in parody metal band, Amidst the Grave's Demons video for "Save My Life".

Personal life
Luhrs married Kristen Michelle Welch in 2011 but they have since separated. Luhrs is a devout Christian. Luhrs also won the Artist Philanthropic Award at the APMA Awards of 2016. He is a part of a non-denominational church, and is currently in seminary at Gordon-Conwell Theological Seminary.

Discography

August Burns Red

 Messengers (2007)
 Constellations (2009)
 Leveler (2011)
 August Burns Red Presents: Sleddin' Hill (2012)
 Rescue & Restore (2013)
 Found in Far Away Places (2015)
 Phantom Anthem (2017)
 Guardians (2020)
 Death Below (2023)

Collaborations

Bibliography
 Mountains (2018)

References

External links
 

American performers of Christian music
Living people
Solid State Records artists
Fearless Records artists
Christian metal musicians
August Burns Red
1985 births
21st-century American singers